Plays That Good Old Rock and Roll is the second album by Neil Michael Hagerty.  It was released as an LP and CD by Drag City in 2002.

Track listing
All songs written by Hagerty

Side one
"Gratitude" – 3:53
"Oklahoma Township" – 3:51
"The Storm Song" – 3:08
"Shaved C*nt" – 4:39

Side two
"Some People Are Crazy" – 3:10
"Louisa La Ray" – 6:31
"It Could Happen Again" – 1:54
"Sayonora" – 2:35
"Rockslide" – 1:57

Personnel
Neil Michael Hagerty – guitar, vocals
Tim Barnes – drums, gongs
Dan Brown – acoustic bass
Edith Frost – vocals
Miighty Flashlight – electric bass, piano
The Riverview Ramblers – vocal chorus
Adam Shelton – saxophone
Susan Voelz – violin

References

2002 albums
Drag City (record label) albums